= Georgina Whetsel =

Canadian businesswoman

- Born: Georgina Mingo; July 4, 1846; Pictou, Nova Scotia, Canada
- Died: November 24, 1919 (aged 73); Halifax, Nova Scotia

Georgina Whetsel (July 4, 1846 – November 24, 1919) was a Canadian businesswoman who was notable for running an ice-cutting business in Saint John, New Brunswick.

Whetsel was born in Pictou, Nova Scotia and later moved to Boston to be with her older siblings. She met and married her husband Robert Whetsel in Boston. They had four children, the youngest two children were twin girls. They lived in Saint John. Georgina inherited the ice-cutting business after her husband's death. She employed both poor blacks and poor whites in her business. She sold her ice business to the mayor of Saint John in 1900.

In 2021, Whetsel was one of the eight historical Black community members featured in The Saint John Theatre Company production We Were Here.
